Sandella's Flatbread Café is an international fast casual restaurant chain founded in 1994 by Michael J. Stimola. The chain is known for its various proprietary flatbread dishes. It is based in Redding, Connecticut. 

As of October 2015, the company had over 130 restaurants in the United States, India, Malta, Saudi Arabia, United Arab Emirates and Australia. Some of the company's locations are franchise operations. Sandella's Flatbread Café fare includes flatbread sandwiches, wraps, panini sandwiches, rice bowls, flatbread pizza, quesadilla's, salads.

References

Further reading
 
 
 
 
  
 
 Domicini, Emily; Dedgmer, Kay (October 21, 2010). "Taste Buds: Sandella’s Flatbread Cafe". Times Leader.

External links

Sandella's Australia Website

Coffee brands
Coffeehouses and cafés in the United States
Companies based in Fairfield County, Connecticut
Fast-food chains of the United States
Restaurant franchises
Restaurants established in 1994
1994 establishments in Connecticut
Restaurants in Connecticut
Redding, Connecticut